Bassington is a former civil parish, now in the parish of Eglingham, in the county of Northumberland, England. Bassington is traversed by the River Aln. In 1951 the parish had a population of 2.

Governance 
Bassington is in the parliamentary constituency of Berwick-upon-Tweed. Bassington was formerly a township in Eglingham parish, from 1866 Bassington was a civil parish in its own right until it was abolished on 1 April 1955 and merged with Eglingham.

References

Former civil parishes in Northumberland
Eglingham